A data cap, often erroneously referred to as a bandwidth cap, is an artificial restriction imposed on the transfer of data over a network. In particular, it refers to policies imposed by an internet service provider in order to limit customers' usage of their services; typically, exceeding a data cap would require the subscriber to pay additional fees based on whether they have exceeded this limit. Implementation of a data cap is sometimes termed a fair access policy, fair usage policy, or usage-based billing by ISPs.

U.S. ISPs have asserted that data caps are required in order to provide a "fair" service to their respective subscribers. The use of data caps has been criticized for becoming increasingly unnecessary, as decreasing infrastructure costs have made it cheaper for ISPs to increase the capacity of their networks to keep up with the demands of their users, rather than place arbitrary limits on usage. It has also been asserted that data caps are meant to help protect pay television providers that may also be owned by an ISP from competition with over-the-top streaming services.

Although often referred to as a "bandwidth cap", it is not the actual bandwidth (bits per second) that is limited, but the total amount of data downloaded per month.

Standard cap
Generally, each user of a network is expected to use high speed transmission for a short time, for example to download a megabyte web page in less than a second. Continuous usage, such as when sharing files or streaming videos can seriously impair service for others. In DSL, where the core network is shared but the access network is not, this concept is less relevant. However, it becomes more relevant in cable internet, where both the core network and the access network are shared, and on wireless networks, where the total network bandwidth is also relatively narrow.

Example cap
In 2016, U.S. provider Comcast offered a service plan with a data cap of 1 terabyte. At contemporary data consumption rates, each member of a family of four would need to separately watch 100 movies in a month to approach the cap. In that case, typical data usage habits would not exceed that cap.

Unlimited data
"Unlimited data" is sometimes a marketing promotion in which an Internet service provider offers access to Internet without cutting service at the data cap. However, after a user passes some data cap, the provider will begin bandwidth throttling to decrease the user's speed of access to data, slowing down the user's internet use.

Many providers throughout the rest of the world offer no data cap at all, but they may impose a fair use policy, allowing them to disconnect users with excessive download usage.

By region
As of October 2015, there were 58 wired broadband providers in the US that used data caps, among them major wireless cell phone providers such as Verizon Wireless and AT&T.

Before 2010 there was a trend of providing unlimited data without bandwidth throttling. In the United States the Federal Communications Commission has fined service providers for offering unlimited data in a way that misled consumers. In June 2015, the FCC fined AT&T Mobility  for misleading consumers. In October 2016 the FCC reached a settlement with T-Mobile in which they would pay  for failing to disclose restrictions on their unlimited data plans.

Iranian Communications Regulatory Authority set a Fair Usage Policy in 2017.

Justification 
U.S. internet service providers have most recently asserted that data caps are needed in order to provide "fair", tiered services at different price points based on speed and usage.

In 2016, Sonic.net CEO Dane Jasper criticized the historical assertions that data caps are meant to conserve network capacity, arguing that the cost of actually delivering service had "declined much faster than the increase in data traffic". When Sonic was first established in 2008, its infrastructure costs were equivalent to 20% of its revenue, but these had fallen to only 1.5% by 2016 because of the declining costs of equipment. Suddenlink CEO Jerry Kent made a similar assertion in an investors' call, stating that the "days" of having to make investments to keep up with customer demand were "over", and there would be "significant free cash flow generated from the cable operators as our capital expenditures continue to come down."

As most major U.S. internet providers own television providers, it has also been suggested that data caps are intended to discourage users from dropping their pay television subscriptions by placing de facto restrictions on the use of competing streaming video services that are delivered over the internet, such as Netflix. The lobbying group Internet Association additionally argued that data caps are meant to create "artificial scarcity", especially in markets where there is limited competition in broadband, also pointing out that some providers offer their own streaming video services that are exempted from data cap policies, such as Comcast's Stream TV. Comcast defended the exemption by stating that the service is not delivered over the public internet; it can only be used while connected to the provider's home Wi-Fi router.

See also
Bandwidth hogging
Bandwidth management
Bandwidth throttling
Internet in Canada#Usage-based billing (UBB)
Uncapping

References

External links
BroadbandReports.com review of Optimum Online policies

Broadband
Data transmission
Net neutrality